Uvelye is a rural locality (a selo) in Krasnogorsky District, Bryansk Oblast, Russia. The population was 331 in 2010. There are 17 streets.

References 

Rural localities in Krasnogorsky District, Bryansk Oblast